United Libyan Airlines was a Libyan charter airline, headquartered in Benghazi.

History
The company was set up in early 1962 as a Libyan-owned charter airline that initially employed British crews.

References

Defunct airlines of Libya
Airlines established in 1962
Airlines disestablished in 1965